Kinderle is a rural locality (a posyolok) in Biektaw District, Tatarstan. The population was 365 as of 2010.

Geography 
Kinderle is located 40 km southwest of Biektaw, district's administrative centre, and 21 km northeast of Qazan, republic's capital, by road.

History 
The village was established in 1930s.

Since its establishmant was a part of Yüdino District. After 1950 in Biektaw (1950–1963),  Piträç (1963–1965) and Biektaw districts.

References

External links 
 

Rural localities in Vysokogorsky District